The Hitmaker is the Fender Stratocaster owned by American guitarist Nile Rodgers. The guitar is a white 1960s model (sometimes incorrectly identified as a 1959 model) with a hardtail bridge, which has been retrofitted with a 1959 maple neck.

Rodgers got the guitar in a shop in Miami Beach, Florida; at the time, fellow Chic-member and bassist Bernard Edwards suggested he trade in the Gibson he was playing because Rodgers was shifting genres. The Stratocaster was "pivotal" in the development of the funky style that came to be called "chucking".

Hits
Hit songs recorded with The Hitmaker include Sister Sledge, "We Are Family"; Madonna, "Like a Virgin"; Daft Punk, "Get Lucky"; Chic, "Le Freak"; David Bowie, "Let's Dance"; Diana Ross, "I'm Coming Out"; and Duran Duran, "Notorious". The New Musical Express reports that at one time an estimate of the value of the music played through the instrument was $2 billion.

Tribute model
In 2014, the Fender Custom Shop released a tribute model. It has a light alder body and a one-piece maple neck, and three Custom Shop 1969 single-coil Stratocaster pickups. The guitar is finished in Olympic White and relic'ed.

References

External links
Nile Rodgers Hitmaker at Fender Corporation
Nile Rodgers' blog--on almost losing his guitar

Instruments of musicians
Fender Stratocasters
Individual guitars